Tihomir Arsić (21 July 1957 – 7 December 2020) was a Serbian actor. He appeared in more than forty films since 1975.

Selected filmography

References

External links 
 

1957 births
2020 deaths
Male actors from Belgrade
Serbian male film actors
Parovi
Deaths from pancreatic cancer
Deaths from cancer in Serbia
Burials at Belgrade New Cemetery